Watts Point is a point in southwestern British Columbia, Canada, located on the eastern side of Howe Sound northwest of Britannia Beach.

See also
Watts Point volcanic centre

References

Sea-to-Sky Corridor